Alberto Maia is a neighborhood of the city of Camaragibe, state of Pernambuco. The neighborhood is located between the allotments of John Paul II, Santa Terezinha, Santa Maria, Santa Mônica and Santana.

References

External links 
 Neighborhoods of history and municipalities
 Official site

Districts of Camaragibe